Sultan Mahmud Khan (died 1402) was last Khan of the Western Chagatai Khanate (1384–1402). He was the son of Soyurgatmish.

Upon his father's death in 1384, Sultan Mahmud was made khan by Timur. Like Soyurgatmish, Sultan Mahmud was completely powerless, and served as a puppet for Timur. Coins in his name were produced by Timur during his lifetime. Sultan Mahmud's death in 1402 marked the effective end of the line of Chagatai Khans in Transoxiana, who had long been mere figureheads anyway. Although Timur's grandson Ulugh Beg appointed khans as well, they were even less noteworthy, although one, Satuq Khan, was known for attempting to become khan of Moghulistan.

Sultan Mahmud was married to Sa’adat Sultan, Timur's granddaughter by  his son Umar Shaikh Mirza I. His own daughter, Aqi Sultan Khanika, was married to Timur's grandson Ulugh Beg.

References 

1402 deaths
Chagatai khans
14th-century monarchs in Asia
15th-century monarchs in Asia
Year of birth unknown